The Horta Museum is a museum dedicated to the life and work of the Belgian Art Nouveau architect Victor Horta and his time. The museum is housed in Horta's former town house and workshop, built in 1898. It is located at 23–25, / in the Brussels municipality of Saint-Gilles, Belgium.

Housed in the Art Nouveau interiors is a permanent display of furniture, utensils and art objects designed by Horta and his contemporaries, as well as documents related to his life and time. The museum also organises temporary exhibitions on topics related to Horta and his art.

The building is inscribed on the UNESCO World Heritage List as one of the major town houses of Victor Horta in Brussels.

Awards
The UNESCO commission recognised the Horta Museum as UNESCO World Heritage in 2000, as part of the listing 'Major Town Houses of the Architect Victor Horta':

An extensive restoration project was completed in 2013. In 2014, it won the European Union Prize for Cultural Heritage / Europa Nostra Award.

Gallery

See also
 Art Nouveau in Brussels
 History of Brussels
 Belgium in "the long nineteenth century"

References

Notes

Further reading

External links

 www.hortamuseum.be
 Horta Museum on BALaT - Belgian Art Links and Tools (KIK-IRPA, Brussels)

Houses in Belgium
Museums in Brussels
Historic house museums in Belgium
Biographical museums in Belgium
Saint-Gilles, Belgium
World Heritage Sites in Belgium
Victor Horta buildings
Art Nouveau architecture in Brussels
Art Nouveau houses
Houses completed in 1901
Museums devoted to one artist